Sarah Drummond was a prominent member of Bacon's Rebellion.

Sarah Drummond may also refer to:

Sarah Drummond, character in Borat 2
Sarah Drummond (Torchwood), fictional character
Sarah Drummond, fictional character in Wagon Train played by June Lockhart
Sarah Drummond, fictional character in All Families Are Psychotic
Sarah Drummond, fictional character in Season of Fear